Leslie Glass is an American author, playwright, journalist, philanthropist, and filmmaker. Along with her daughter, she  founded Reach Out Recovery, a United States-based nonprofit addiction recovery organization.

Writing and film work
Glass is the author of fifteen novels, nine of which compose a New York Times Bestselling series. This sequence of novels center around an NYPD detective, April Woo, the first Asian-American female detective in American mainstream fiction. The first title in the series, Burning Time, was published in 1993 by Bantam Books, a Random House imprint.

Glass began her career in advertising and publishing at New York magazine, where she wrote the "Intelligencer" column. Her writing has been featured in Redbook and Cosmopolitan and translated into six foreign languages. She also worked as a scriptwriter for the soap opera Guiding Light.

Her novel Over His Dead Body was produced for the stage by Robert Brustein under the name Strokes at the American Repertory Theater. This work, the novels Getting Away with It, Modern Love, and the entirety of the April Woo series have been optioned for feature films.

Glass produced and directed The Secret World of Recovery. The film was first showcased at Sarasota Film Festival in May 2014. The movie was released in 2014 and was the winner of the 2016 American Society of Addiction Medicine Media Award. In 2013, Glass produced and directed The Silent Majority.

Reach Out Recovery 
In 2011 Leslie Glass and her daughter, social worker Lindsey Glass,
founded Reach Out Recovery, a nonprofit organization promoting community solutions for recovery from addiction in Sarasota, Florida.

The organization was inspired by Glass's own journey in the recovery world, when about 18 years ago her daughter struggled with substance use in her late teens and early 20s. The lack of resources and support motivated the mother and daughter to provide help for other families facing the same issues.

Leslie Glass produced and directed the 2012 documentary titled "the Secret World of Recovery" which tells some of the mother and daughter story and what happens after people leave addiction treatment and start on the next phase of their lives in recovery. The documentary premiered at the Sarasota Film Festival in 2011 and also won the 2016 Association of Addiction Medicine Media Award.

She produced and directed the Silent Majority, a 2014 teen addiction prevention documentary that premiered at the Gasparilla Film Festival in 2014 and on PBS station WEDU and was distributed by American Public Television to PBS stations nationwide in 2015.

Bibliography

Novels

April Woo Series
Burning Time (1993), Bantam Books
Hanging Time (1995), Bantam Books
Loving Time (1996), Bantam Books
Judging Time (1998), Signet Books
Stealing Time (1999), Signet Books
Tracking Time (2000), Signet Books
The Silent Bride (2002), Onyx
A Killing Gift (2003), Onyx
A Clean Kill (2005), Onyx

Other works
Getting Away with It (1976), Doubleday Books
Modern Love (1983), St. Martin's Press
To Do No Harm (1992) Doubleday Books
Natural Suspect: A Collaborative Novel (2001), devised by William Bernhardt, Ballantine Books
Over His Dead Body: A Novel of Sweet Revenge (2003), Ballantine Books
For Love and Money: A Novel of Stocks and Robbers (2004), Ballantine Books
Sleeper (2010)

Short stories 
High Stakes: Eight stories of Gambling and Crime (2003), Robert J. Randisi (Editor), Signet Books
The Blue Religion: New Stories about Cops, Criminals, and the Chase (2008), Michael Connelly (Editor), Little, Brown and Company

Plays 
Strokes (1984)
The Survivors (1989)
On The Edge (1991)

Films 
The Secret World of Recovery documentary (2012)
The Silent Majority documentary (2013)

References

External links 
 Random House Author Spotlight
 Author Interview: Leslie Glass

20th-century American novelists
21st-century American novelists
American crime fiction writers
American women novelists
Living people
Sarah Lawrence College alumni
Novelists from New York (state)
20th-century American women writers
21st-century American women writers
Women crime fiction writers
1945 births